Dralfa Point (‘Nos Dralfa’ \'nos 'dral-fa\) is the point on the south side of the entrance to Patagonia Bay and the north side of the entrance to Fournier Bay, forming the north extremity of Thompson Peninsula on the northeast coast of Anvers Island in the Palmer Archipelago, Antarctica, 26 km south-southeast of Cape Grönland, 7.07 km south by east of Gourdon Point and 18.6 km northwest of Ryswyck Point.

The point is named after the settlement of Dralfa in northeastern Bulgaria.

Location
British mapping in 1980.

Maps
 British Antarctic Territory.  Scale 1:200000 topographic map.  DOS 610 Series, Sheet W 64 62.  Directorate of Overseas Surveys, UK, 1980.
 Antarctic Digital Database (ADD). Scale 1:250000 topographic map of Antarctica. Scientific Committee on Antarctic Research (SCAR), 1993–2016.

References
 Bulgarian Antarctic Gazetteer. Antarctic Place-names Commission. (details in Bulgarian, basic data in English)
 Dralfa Point. SCAR Composite Antarctic Gazetteer.
 Punta Gourdon. SCAR Composite Antarctic Gazetteer.

External links
 Dralfa Point. Copernix satellite image

Headlands of the Palmer Archipelago
Bulgaria and the Antarctic